Sararud-e Sofla (also Romanized as Sarārūd-e Soflá; also known as Sarārū, Sarārūd, Sarārūd-e Pā‘īn, and Sararūd-e Pā’īn) is a village in Dorudfaraman Rural District, in the Central District of Kermanshah County, Kermanshah Province, Iran. At the 2006 census, its population was 505, in 129 families.

References 

Populated places in Kermanshah County